Stark Fear is a 1962 American film directed by Ned Hochman. The screenplay concerns a husband who plans to murder his wife.

Plot 
A sadistic husband mentally tortures his wife, while eventually planning to murder her. Although no one believes her, she gets help from an unexpected source.

Cast 
Beverly Garland as Ellen Winslow
Skip Homeier as Gerald Winslow
Kenneth Tobey as Cliff Kane
Hannah Stone
George Clow
Paul Scovil
Edna Neuman
John Arville
Bruce Palmer
Carey Mount
Cortez Ewing
Bob Stone
Barbara Freeman
Darlene Dana Reno
Joseph Benton

External links 

 

1962 films
1962 drama films
1960s English-language films
American black-and-white films
American drama films
1960s American films